The 2018 Cebu City Sharks season is the 1st season of the franchise in the Maharlika Pilipinas Basketball League (MPBL).

Key dates
 June 12, 2018: Regular Season Begins.

Current roster

Head coaches

Datu Cup

Standings

Game log

|- style="background:#fcc;"
| 1
| June 21
| Bacoor
| L 71–76
| Ceasar Catli (15)
| Ceasar Catli (10)
| 4 Players (2)
| Muntinlupa Sports Complex
| 0–1

|- style="background:#;"
| 2
| July 3
| Parañaque
| 
| 
| 
| 
| Olivarez College Gymnasium
| 0–1
|- style="background:#;"
| 3
| July 12
| Basilan
| 
| 
| 
| 
| Strike Gymnasium
| 0–1
|- style="background:#;"
| 4
| July 24
| Manila
| 
| 
| 
| 
| Cuneta Astrodome
| 0–1

References

Cebu City Sharks Season, 2018